Lee Won-jae (born 24 February 1986) is a South Korean football player who plays as a centre-back.

Honours

Club
Pohang Steelers
Korean FA Cup: 2012

References

External links

1986 births
Living people
South Korean footballers
Association football defenders
Pohang Steelers players
Jeonbuk Hyundai Motors players
Ulsan Hyundai FC players
Ansan Mugunghwa FC players
Daegu FC players
Gyeongnam FC players
Manama Club players
Lee Won-jae
Bhayangkara F.C. players
K League 1 players
K League 2 players
Bahraini Premier League players
Lee Won-jae
Liga 1 (Indonesia) players
South Korean expatriate footballers
Expatriate footballers in Bahrain
South Korean expatriate sportspeople in Thailand
Expatriate footballers in Thailand
South Korean expatriate sportspeople in Indonesia
Expatriate footballers in Indonesia